The 2011 Gombe State gubernatorial election was the 4th gubernatorial election of Gombe State, Nigeria. Held on April 26, 2011, the People's Democratic Party nominee Ibrahim Hassan Dankwambo won the election, defeating Abubakar Aliyu of the Congress for Progressive Change.

Results 
A total of 6 candidates contested in the election. Ibrahim Hassan Dankwambo from the People's Democratic Party won the election, defeating Abubakar Aliyu from the Congress for Progressive Change. Valid votes was 780,393, votes cast was 801,747, 21,354 votes was cancelled.

References 

Gombe State gubernatorial elections
Gombe gubernatorial
April 2011 events in Nigeria